Leonard Bratley (24 September 1914 – July 1974), was an English professional rugby league footballer who played in the 1930s and 1940s.

Background
Len Bratley was born in Newton Hill, Wakefield, West Riding of Yorkshire, England, he was the landlord of the Admiral Duncan public house, 100 Thornes Lane, Wakefield, he also worked at Lofthouse Colliery, and he died aged 59.

Playing career

International honours
Len Bratley won a cap for England while at Wakefield Trinity in 1945 against Wales.

County honours
Len Bratley was selected for Yorkshire County XIII while at Wakefield Trinity during the 1945–46 season.

County League appearances
Len Bratley played in Wakefield Trinity's victory in the Yorkshire county league during the 1945–46 season.

Challenge Cup Final appearances
Len Bratley played  in Wakefield Trinity's 13–12 victory over Wigan in the 1946 Challenge Cup Final during the 1945–46 season at Wembley Stadium, London on Saturday 4 May 1946.

County Cup Final appearances
Len Bratley played  in Wakefield Trinity's 2–5 defeat by Bradford Northern in the 1945 Yorkshire County Cup Final during the 1945–46 season at Thrum Hall, Halifax on Saturday 3 November 1945, played  in the 10–0 victory over Hull F.C. in the 1946 Yorkshire County Cup Final during the 1946–47 season at Headingley Rugby Stadium, Leeds on Saturday 31 November 1946, played  in the 7–7 draw with Leeds in the 1947 Yorkshire County Cup Final during the 1947–48 season at Fartown Ground, Huddersfield on Saturday 1 November 1947, and played , and scored a try in the 8–7 victory over Leeds in the 1947 Yorkshire County Cup Final replay during the 1947–48 season at Odsal Stadium, Bradford on Wednesday 5 November 1947.

Club career
Len Bratley was transferred from York to Wakefield Trinity during November 1937, he made his début for Wakefield Trinity in the 12-5 victory over Salford at Belle Vue, Wakefield on Saturday 13 November 1937, he appears to have scored no drop-goals (or field-goals as they are currently known in Australasia), but prior to the 1974–75 season all goals, whether; conversions, penalties, or drop-goals, scored 2-points, consequently prior to this date drop-goals were often not explicitly documented, therefore '0' drop-goals may indicate drop-goals not recorded, rather than no drop-goals scored. In addition, prior to the 1949–50 season, the archaic field-goal was also still a valid means of scoring points.

Testimonial match
A benefit season/testimonial match for Len Bratley and Billy Teall took place at Wakefield Trinity including the 29–0 victory over Hull F.C. at Belle Vue, Wakefield on Saturday 3 April 1948 during the 1947–48 season.

Career records
Len Bratley set two records for Wakefield Trinity for a forward by scoring 15-tries in a season, including a record 5-tries in the 34–12 victory over Huddersfield.

References

External links

1914 births
1974 deaths
England national rugby league team players
English rugby league players
Rugby league players from Wakefield
Rugby league locks
Rugby league props
Wakefield Trinity players
York Wasps players
Yorkshire rugby league team players